In the last sixteen days of President Thomas Jefferson's presidency, the Congress replaced the Embargo Act of 1807 with the almost unenforceable Non-Intercourse Act of March 1809. This Act lifted all embargoes on American shipping except for those bound for British or French ports. Its intent was to damage the economies of the United Kingdom and France. Like its predecessor, the Embargo Act, it was mostly ineffective, and contributed to the coming of the War of 1812. In addition, it seriously damaged the economy of the United States. The Non-Intercourse Act was followed by Macon's Bill Number 2. Despite hurting the economy as a whole, the bill did help America begin to industrialize, as no British manufactured goods could be imported, so these goods instead had to be produced domestically.

References

External links
 
 

United States foreign relations legislation
United States federal trade legislation
War of 1812 legislation
1809 in American law
1809 in American politics
10th United States Congress